Katiki Waterfalls is located in Alluri Sitharama Raju district of the Indian state of Andhra Pradesh. The waterfall originates at River Gosthani. The waterfall is named after its location Katiki.

References 

Waterfalls of Andhra Pradesh